Elections for all positions in the Philippines above the barangay (except for Autonomous Region in Muslim Mindanao regional level) were held on May 10, 2010. The elected president is Benigno Aquino III, the 15th President of the Philippines, succeeding President Gloria Macapagal Arroyo who was barred from seeking re-election due to term restrictions. The successor of Vice-President Noli de Castro is Jejomar Binay, the 13th Vice President of the Philippines. The legislators elected in the 2010 elections joined the senators of the 2007 elections and comprised the 15th Congress of the Philippines.

The 2010 elections were administered by the Commission on Elections (COMELEC) in compliance with the Republic Act No. 9369, also known as the Amended Computerization Act of 2007. It was the first national, and second overall computerized election after the 2008 Autonomous Region in Muslim Mindanao regional election in the history of the Philippines. Although there were cases of precinct count optical scan (PCOS) machine failures, there was no postponement of elections since most technical issues were resolved by election day. Despite the fact that some provinces have reported failure of elections, these have not surpassed the 0.50% of the total number of PCOS machines, and most were replaced on time.

Local elections were held in all provinces, cities and municipalities for provincial governors, vice governors and board members, and city/municipal mayors, vice mayors and councilors.

There were more than 85,000 candidates for 17,000 national and local positions and it is believed that the youth had the swing vote in this election as 40% of voters are 18–35 and there are a potential 3 million first-time voters.

Background 
The current Philippine constitution allows a president to serve for only one six-year term; however, former president Gloria Macapagal Arroyo served for a total of nine years because she took over the last three years of Joseph Estrada's administration when Estrada was ousted as the result of the 2001 EDSA Revolution. In 2004, Arroyo won the election and finished her 6-year term in 2010.

General issues 

In a decision dated December 2, 2009, the Supreme Court ruled that appointive officials seeking positions in the elections do not need to resign from their posts, striking down Section 4(a) of COMELEC Resolution 8678, Section 13 of Republic Act 9369, and Section 66 of the Omnibus Election Code as unconstitutional, "for violating the equal protection clause and being too broad."

Party-switching 
As election day approached, several politicians switched political parties in order to gain votes and funding for the campaign. Many switches were controversial, with the ruling party Lakas Kampi CMD having the most defections, most of which went either to the Liberal Party or to the Nacionalista Party.

The politicians who switched parties after the start of the local campaign period are:

Furthermore, Luis "Chavit" Singson resigned from Lakas and endorsed a candidate aside from Gilberto Teodoro, but did not join another party. Singson endorsed Villar, then resigned from Lakas, but has not joined Villar's Nacionalista Party.

Controversies 

Five days before the elections, petitions were made to postpone the elections due to technical malfunctions with the electronic voting machines. On May 7, 2010, the Supreme Court rejected the petitions, affirming the vote would go ahead as planned.

Several cities and provinces encountered several problems, postponing the election.
In Caloocan, voting was delayed as the box of ballots delivered to clustered precinct 599 in the city's Pajo district contained ballots for a clustered precinct in Sampaloc, Manila.

Election-related violence 

Prior to the end of the filing of certificates of candidacy, the COMELEC had anticipated several areas to be named as "election hotspots".

On November 23, 2009, the entourage of the wife of Buluan, Maguindanao vice-mayor Esmael Mangudadatu who ran for provincial governor, including journalists, were abducted and killed in the province's town of Ampatuan. Before she was killed, Mangudadatu's wife blamed provincial governor Andal Ampatuan Jr. as the culprit. Ampatuan Jr. was later arrested. After several arms and military vehicles were seized in Ampatuans' properties and government installations, President Arroyo declared martial law in parts of the province not controlled by the Moro Islamic Liberation Front on December 4.

On December 28, 2009, a candidate for councilor died, and two incumbent officials were wounded in an ambush in Dingras, Ilocos Norte. The gunmen fired at the convoy including barangay chairwoman Joen Caniete, who was running for councilor under the Nacionalista Party; the wounded included a sitting councilor and a provincial board member.

In Sorsogon, Julio Esquivias, a Nacionalista candidate for councilor in the town of Casiguran, died due to a gunshot wound after he was shot by an unidentified gunman.

In a command conference by the Armed Forces of the Philippines, Philippine National Police and the COMELEC, 14 election "hotspots" were identified. They were Abra, Ilocos Norte, Masbate and Nueva Ecija in Luzon, Samar (Western Samar), Eastern Samar and Antique in the Visayas, and Basilan, Sulu, Maguindanao, Lanao del Norte, Lanao del Sur, Sarangani, and Zamboanga Sibugay in Mindanao.

Worsening private armed violence was a serious security concern which had the capacity to undermine the 2010 elections. Even though a commission was already formed to dismantle private armies, skeptics were unconvinced that the government could have succeeded in this task as it had a poor track record of dealing with the ongoing problem of internal violence.

Before election day, a bomb exploded at 1:20 a.m. in Ampatuan, Maguindanao. No casualties were reported. In Conception, Iloilo, armed men fired at the Liberal Party headquarters. No casualties were reported.

During election day, three bombs exploded at a polling precinct at Pakpak elementary school in Marawi City, Lanao del Sur. No casualties or injuries were reported. Another bomb exploded in Zamboanga Sibugay, killing three people. Two bombs exploded at Mindanao State University where several polling precinct were clustered. An NK2 grenade exploded at Shariff Aguak, Maguindanao. No casualties reported. On the same day, at 12:00nn (PST), a shooting incident happened in the same area between the rival candidates. Two innocent persons were killed.

As of 1:30pm (PST) fourteen casualties were reported due to election-related violence. at 2:25pm (PST), a shooting incident in a barangay in Maguindanao caused the local cancellation of the elections.

Constitutionality of the elections 
Many concerned civil society groups including the Center for People Empowerment in Governance (CenPEG), Philippine Computer Society (PCS), and Global Filipino Nation (GFN) protested the illegality and unconstitutionality of how the elections were conducted, particularly with implementing safety measures against fraud and cheating.

In an interim report by GFN 2010 Election Observers Team released on May 27 titled "Foreign Observers Challenge Election Legitimacy", they presented arguments questioning the May 10, 2010 elections summarized below:

 The election results transmitted from the precincts do not have digital signatures of the Board of Election Inspectors (BEI)
 The number of disenfranchised voters is sufficient to greatly affect the results of the elections.
 The Automated Election System (AES) was implemented without the appropriate field testing, and law-specified testing in actual elections.
 The source code review was not completed and initial findings were not addressed.
 No audit was done on the AES prior to the elections. There was only a mandated random manual audit which was not yet done at the time the report was written (May 27, 2010).
 Several voter and security features were disabled prior to elections.

Many different groups also echoed the same sentiments like Kaakbay Partylist in its critique of the May 10, 2010 polls. They also questioned the removal of digital signatures

Removal of digital signatures 
While Republic Act 9369 states that "The election returns transmitted electronically and digitally signed shall be considered as official election results and shall be used as the basis for the canvassing of votes and the proclamation of a candidate.", the Commission on Elections (COMELEC) issued Resolution 8786 on March 4, 2010, which became the basis for the decision to remove digital signatures which the COMELEC ruled as no longer necessary. Three Board of Election Inspectors (BEIs) were originally required to put in their iButton Key for the results to be digitally signed before transmission and make it official. But because of the issuance of COMELEC Resolution 8786, BEIs were directed to press "No" when asked by the PCOS machines to digitally sign the files for transmission.

In the joint committee meeting at Batasang Pambansa, Senator Enrile asked the COMELEC officials why they removed the use of the digital signatures. Cesar Flores, Smartmatic Asia Pacific president, said “The voting machine has a digital signature in itself which is also corroborated in the card and the password that is provided to the BEIs. The BEIs when they sign the password, they encrypt the result, and the result is digitally signed.” (Sic)

Kaakbay Partylist released its critique of the election on June 6, 2010. The group cited complaints regarding the removal of main security features and verifiability of votes and also answered the arguments of those given by the COMELEC officials:

"On March 4, 2010, Comelec issued Resolution 8786 dated March 4, 2010, essentially disabling the use of digital signatures. Thus, the electronically transmitted votes from the precincts no longer bear digital signatures. Several excuses were given by Comelec ranging from PCOS machine signatures being equivalent to digital signature (which of course is not true); use of digital signature will require another P1 billion (as if digital feature is not included in the P7.1-billion contract); reducing transmission time (how less than one minute signing digitally will reduce much a transmission of about 30 to 60 minutes?); and the PCOS i-button and BEI Personal Identification Numbers (PINs) are equivalents (of course, not)".

Candidates

Ang Karapatan

Bangon Pilipinas

Kilusang Bagong Lipunan

Gibo-Edu

Aquino-Roxas

Team Villar-Legarda

Erap-Binay

Others

Results 
Reports indicated that the election day was marred with controversies, particularly in the insurgent-ridden province of Mindanao, though other provinces also faced difficulties such as computer glitches on the voting machines, disorderly conduct, vote buying, and violence. In Cebu City, spikes placed by unidentified men on the road caused a delay in the delivery of ballot boxes throughout the province of Cebu early Monday.

A total of over 76,340 precinct count optical scanner (PCOS) machines, about 5,000 back-up units, and about 1,700 servers were deployed in the country's first nationwide fully automated elections—from counting of votes to transmission and canvassing of election results. Election Day had live full coverage from GMA Network and ABS-CBN. Besides logistical problems, during the last few days prior to the election poll machine and services supplier Smartmatic-Total Information Management (TIM) found cases of PCOS machine failures. Nonetheless, it was decided not to postpone elections since the technical issues were resolved quickly and the solution could be deployed by the day of election. Despite the fact that some provinces reported issues in the election process, these did not surpass the 0.50% of the total number of PCOS machines, and most were replaced on time, as planned for. As a result of the delays, the COMELEC extended voting hours from 6:00 p.m. to 7:00 p.m. and continued through the night transmitting the votes from every precinct scattered across the country.

After the elections closed and transmissions from PCOS machines began arriving en masse and the COMELEC was able to publish the first partial results, many former doubts and concerns vanished, replaced by astonishment due to the unprecedented speed of the tally.

President 

The presidential candidate with the greatest number of votes, Benigno Aquino III was declared the winner. A separate election was held for the vice president; the two elected officials need not be running mates in order to be elected.

Vice president

Congress

Senate 

One-half of the Philippine Senate was up for election. The Philippines uses the plurality-at-large voting system for the Senate race.

House of Representatives 

All seats in the House were up for election, elections were done for legislative districts and party-list.

Elections at congressional districts

Party-list election

Local 

 Batangas
 Bohol
 Bulacan
 Marilao
 Meycauayan
  Laguna
 Metro Manila
 Caloocan
 Makati
 Manila
 Marikina
 Navotas
 Quezon City
 Taguig
 Valenzuela
 Marinduque
  Mountain Province
 Tarlac
 Tarlac City
 Zamboanga City

International reaction 
The United States and the European Union praised the republic for the smooth elections. The US embassy was one of the first to hail the general elections.

Seeing the patience and the number of people turned in the elections, EU ambassador Alistair MacDonald shared his experience and reflection in observing the Filipinos.

MacDonald also expressed that the EU was impressed for the elections being "smooth” and “generally trouble-free.”

He also appreciated the teacher's hard work for the said elections.

See also 
 15th Congress of the Philippines

References

External links 
 Official website of the Commission on Elections

Results
Philippines 2010 Election Results – Main Site
Philippines 2010 Election Results – Alternate Site
PPCRV Map Viewer – PPCRV Encoded Site
PPCRV Map Viewer – PPCRV Site
NAMFREL – 2010 PARALLEL COUNT – NAMFREL Site
HALALAN 2010: Latest Comelec official results – ABS-CBN Site
ELEKSYON 2010: National Election Results Tally – GMA Site
ELEKSYON 2010: Regional Election Results Tally – GMA Site
Auto-Vote 2010: Presidential Election Results – Hatol ng Bayan Site
Auto-Vote 2010: Vice-Presidential Election Results – Hatol ng Bayan Site
Auto-Vote 2010: Senatorial Election Results – Hatol ng Bayan Site
The Vote 2010 Election Results Tally – Bombo Radyo Site

 
2010 elections in the Philippines
2010